Firebase Illingworth is a former U.S. Army firebase northwest of Tây Ninh in southwest Vietnam.

History
This firebase was named for US Army Corporal John James Illingworth, a member of Alpha Company, 2nd Battalion, 8th Cavalry Regiment, posthumous recipient of the Silver Star.

The firebase was first established in March 1970 by the 8th Cavalry Regiment, 35 km northwest of Tây Ninh and approximately 5 km from the Cambodian border.

On 1 April the base was occupied by Companies C and E, 2nd Battalion, 8th Cavalry, B Battery, 5th Battalion, 2nd Artillery, A Battery, 1st Battalion, 30th Artillery, A Battery, 2nd Battalion, 32nd Artillery and B Battery, 1st Battalion, 77th Artillery. At approximately 02:00 the People's Army of Vietnam (PAVN) hit the base with over 300 rounds of mortar and recoilless rifle fire and then assaulted the base with a force of over 400 troops. During the attack an ammunition dump containing over 190 rounds exploded. By 05:00 the attack had been repulsed at a cost of 24 U.S. killed and 54 wounded and 88 PAVN killed. SP4 Peter C. Lemon would be awarded the Medal of Honor for his actions during the battle.

Current use
The base has reverted to farmland.

References

Installations of the United States Army in South Vietnam
Buildings and structures in Tây Ninh province